James Hayward (born September 17, 1970) is a Canadian retired film director, screenwriter and animator.

Biography

At a young age, Hayward began his career at Mainframe Entertainment animating and directing commercials. He was one of the original animators of the television series ReBoot. Throughout his career, he has worked at Pixar Animation Studios, 20th Century Fox and Blue Sky Studios, and was an animator for Toy Story, A Bug's Life, Toy Story 2, Monsters, Inc. and Finding Nemo. He was the sequence director and story consultant for Robots.

His studio directorial debut, Dr. Seuss' Horton Hears a Who! starring Jim Carrey and Steve Carell, had a worldwide gross of $298.6 million.

Hayward's first live-action film, Jonah Hex, was released in June 2010.

Hayward was also director and writer on an animated film Free Birds, starring Woody Harrelson, Owen Wilson and Amy Poehler, which was released in 2013 to unfavourable critical reception, but financial success.

Filmography

Feature films

Short films

Television

Video games

References

External links

 

1970 births
Blue Sky Studios people
Canadian animated film directors
Canadian guitarists
Film directors from Ontario
Canadian male screenwriters
Living people
Writers from Kingston, Ontario
Pixar people
21st-century Canadian screenwriters
21st-century Canadian male writers